Maiangi Waitai is a New Zealand-born artist of Ngā Wairiki, Ngāti Apa, Tuwhāretoa, Rangitāne and German descent.  She works across a range of mediums, designing clothing and accessories for her Who is Dead Martin label, creating comics, figurines, toys, jewellery, mosaics and painting. She has also been a musician, singing and playing the flute and guitar in a band called Beam (1997-1999) with Colleen Lenihan, Guy Scoullar and Hayden Fritchley, also artists at the time in Whanganui. She has worked as a kindergarten teacher since 2010.

Education and awards 
Waitai received a Bachelor of Arts from Quay School of the Arts in Whanganui in 1999. The same year, she received a Te Waka Toi award from Creative New Zealand.

Exhibitions 
 Bowen Galleries, Wellington, 2000, 2002, 2004, 2006, 2007, 2012 
 Tea Time (with Ron Dixon, Don Driver), Enjoy Gallery, Wellington, 22 October 2009 - 14 November 2009
Ātea-ā-rangi - Interstellar, The Dowse, 15 Jun – 20 Oct 2019

References 

New Zealand comics artists
New Zealand female comics artists
Living people
Year of birth missing (living people)